Gerrans Bay to Camels Cove is a coastal Site of Special Scientific Interest (SSSI) in south Cornwall, England, UK, noted for both its biological and geological interest.

Geography
It starts at Creek Stephen Point in the west, following the coast of Gerrans Bay to Nare Head and then on to Manare Point, near Portloe in the east and also includes Gull Rock off the coast.

The South West Coast Path runs through the SSSI and most of the coastline is owned by the National Trust.

The site lies within the Cornwall Area of Outstanding Natural Beauty (AONB).

History
This site is an amalgamation of two previous SSSIs; Gerrans Bay to Nare Head SSSI and Camels Cove SSSI.

References

Sites of Special Scientific Interest in Cornwall
Sites of Special Scientific Interest notified in 1951
National Trust properties in Cornwall
Cornish coast